Vapaliximab is a chimeric monoclonal antibody and an experimental immunosuppressive drug. Development was discontinued by 2012.

References

Monoclonal antibodies